William the Fourth  may refer to:
 William IV, a list of kings by the name
 William Pitt, 1st Earl of Chatham, satirically called William the Fourth, a leading statesman in the era of King George III
 The fourth book in the Just William series by Richmal Crompton